North Carolina Highway 111 (NC 111) is a  primary state highway in the U.S. state of North Carolina.  Traveling north–south through Eastern North Carolina, it connects the various rural towns and communities with the cities of Jacksonville (via U.S. Route 258 (US 258) and NC 24), Goldsboro and Tarboro.

Route description

History
NC 111 was established in 1930 as a new primary routing between NC 11, in Kornegay, and US 70/NC 10, in Goldsboro; the highway was mostly graded dirt, serving the Drummersville community. By 1935, NC 111 was extended through Goldsboro to Cherry Hospital, replacing NC 402. In 1940, NC 111 was rerouted at Albertson.

Between 1939-44, NC 111 was rerouted in Goldsboro, to accommodate the United States Army Air Corps Technical Training School (later becoming Seymour Johnson Air Force Base), it was moved from Slocumb Street to Piedmont Road. By 1948, NC 111 was rerouted southeast of NC 11 to Beulaville, ending at NC 24/NC 41; its old alignment along Williams Road was downgraded to secondary road (SR 1701). By 1949, NC 111 was truncated at US 70A/US 117A/NC 581 in Goldsboro; its routing to Cherry Hospital was replaced by NC 581. In 1959, NC 111 was rerouted for Seymour Johnson Air Force Base again, to its current approach to US 70; its old alignment became secondary roads Old 111 Highway (SR 1710) and Piedmont Airline Road (SR 1755).

In August 1984, NC 111 was extended, along with NC 41, south to Chinquapin, where it split off and continued west to its current southern terminus at US 258/NC 24, in Catherine Lake. This routing was initially established as a new primary routing for NC 144 a month prior, but was subsequently replaced before any actual signage was made.

On January 1, 1985, NC 111 was rerouted onto new northern bypass routing of Goldsboro, along with US 70; it then was extended as a new primary routing north to NC 222, near Eureka. The former Goldsboro downtown alignment was replaced with US 70 Business.

In May 1994, NC 111 was extended north along NC 222 to north of Saratoga, where it continues along new primary routing to Tarboro. In Tarboro, it took Wilson Street to 
Main Street south, crossing the Tar River, into Princeville and then overlapping briefly with US 258 before continuing east along Greenwood Boulevard. At Fountain Fork, NC 111 turns northeast and ends at its current northern terminus at NC 11/NC 44, in Oak City. In July 1994, NC 111, and other primary routes, were rerouted out of Tarboro and onto US 64/US 258 over the Tar River to Princeville.

North Carolina Highway 402

North Carolina Highway 402 (NC 402) was established as a new primary spur highway from US 1/US 17/NC 40 in Goldsboro to Cherry Hospital, a state operated psychiatric hospital, via Ash Street. By 1935, it was renumbered as part of NC 111.

Junction list

References

External links

NCRoads.com: N.C. 111
NCRoads.com: N.C. 402

111
Transportation in Onslow County, North Carolina
Transportation in Duplin County, North Carolina
Transportation in Wayne County, North Carolina
Transportation in Wilson County, North Carolina
Transportation in Edgecombe County, North Carolina
Transportation in Martin County, North Carolina